James Williams (born 1952) is an Irish former hurler and Gaelic footballer. At club level he played with Kilruane MacDonaghs and was also a member of the Tipperary senior teams as a dual player.

Career

Williams first played hurling and Gaelic football at juvenile and underage levels with the Kilruane MacDonaghs club. He won a number of divisional minor and under-21 titles in both codes and was also a member of the team that won the first of four consecutive Tipperary Under-21AHC titles in 1973. Williams made his first appearance for the club's senior team as a 16-year-old in 1969. He was at centre-forward on the Kilruane MacDonaghs team that won the All-Ireland Club Championship title in 1986, having earlier won four Tipperary SHC titles, including one as team captain, and a Tipperary SFC title in 1975. His 26-year club career came to an end in 1995.

Williams first appeared on the inter-county scene as a member of the Tipperary minor football team in 1970. He later spent three seasons with the under-21 team, however, his underage career ended without silverware. Williams was just out of the minor grade when he was selected for the senior team in 1971. He became dual inter-county player in 1975 when he joined the Tipperary senior hurling team. Williams was part of the Tipperary team that won the 1978-79 National League.

Honours

Kilruane MacDonaghs
All-Ireland Senior Club Hurling Championship: 1986
Munster Senior Club Hurling Championship: 1985
Tipperary Senior Football Championship: 1975
Tipperary Senior Hurling Championship: 1977, 1978, 1979, 1985
Tipperary Under-21 A Hurling Championship: 1973

Tipperary
National Hurling League: 1978-79

References

External link

 Jim Williams player profile

1952 births
Living people
Kilruane MacDonaghs hurlers
Kilruane MacDonaghs Gaelic footballers
Tipperary inter-county hurlers
Tipperary inter-county Gaelic footballers
Dual players